Vadamerca or Valadamarca (fl. 370s) may have been a Gothic princess and Goth royal family member by birth, and consort of the Rex Hunnorum Balamber, possibly the first ruler of the Huns. The only extant source that mentions her or Balamber is Jordanes' Getica, and it is possible that both are unhistorical.

Name
The first element is probably Gothic valdan, or waldan, meaning 'to rule (a
household), to govern’, from an earlier PGmc walđanan. The second element is marka, 'horse', from PGmc *marχaz, an early loan from Celtic. Another female name with the same second element is attested from West Francia, Childomarca.

Biography

The only source that mentions the existence of a Gothic princess named Vadamerca or her husband Balamber is Jordanes' Getica, which may derive mention of both from Gothic oral tradition. According to Jordanes, Vadamerca was the granddaughter of Vinitharius, king of the Goths, and a member of the Amal dynasty. Arne Søby Christensen notes several chronological problems with Jordanes's narrative surrounding Vadamerca and suggests that it may not be historical.

Her grandfather Vinitharius fought three battles against the Huns, who were led by Balamber. He was successful in the first two clashes, but eventually lost the third fight, which took place by the river Erac. Vinitharius died on this occasion, as he was killed by king Balamber with an arrow shot to his head.

After the victory, Balamber, the first known king of the Huns, took Vadamerca in marriage. Such marriage consolidated his rule over the Goths. These type of royal intermarriages (cf. Heqin) were part of the Hun mode of conquest. He ruled the Goths peacefully and consented them to be governed by a Goth. However, the Huns would themselves choose their Gothic ruler.

References

Works cited

4th-century Gothic people
4th-century women
Gothic women